Iniesta is a Spanish surname that may refer to
Alberto Iniesta Jiménez (1923–2016), Spanish prelate of the Roman Catholic Church
 Andrés Iniesta (born 1984), Spanish football player
Baltasar Mena Iniesta (born 1942), Spanish-born Mexican mechanical engineer
 Roberto Iniesta (born 1962), Spanish singer and guitarist 

Spanish-language surnames